Sentinel-5 Precursor (Sentinel-5P) is an Earth observation satellite developed by ESA as part of the Copernicus Programme to close the gap in continuity of observations between Envisat and Sentinel-5.

Overview
Sentinel-5 Precursor is the first mission of the Copernicus Programme dedicated to monitoring air pollution. Its instrument is an ultraviolet, visible, near and short-wavelength infrared spectrometer called Tropomi. The satellite is built on a hexagonal Astrobus L 250 satellite bus equipped with S- and X-band communication antennas, three foldable solar panels generating 1500 watts and hydrazine thrusters for station-keeping.

The satellite operates in an 824 km Sun-synchronous orbit with a Local Time of Ascending Node of 13:30 hours.

Tropomi instrument

Sentinel-5 Precursor carries a single instrument,
Tropomi (TROPOspheric Monitoring Instrument), which is a spectrometer sensing ultraviolet (UV), visible (VIS), near (NIR) and short-wavelength infrared (SWIR) to monitor ozone, methane, formaldehyde, aerosol, carbon monoxide, NO2 and SO2 in the atmosphere. It extends the capabilities of the OMI from the Aura satellite and the SCIAMACHY instrument from Envisat.

Tropomi will be taking measurements every second covering an area of approximately 2600 km wide and 7 km long in a resolution of 7 x 7 km. Light will be separated into different wavelengths using grating spectrometers and then measured with four different detectors for respective spectral bands. The UV spectrometer has a spectral range of 270-320 nm, the visible light spectrometer has a range of 310-500 nm, NIR has a range of 675-775 nm, and SWIR has a range of 2305-2385 nm.

The instrument is split into four major blocks: UV-VIS-NIR spectrometers and a calibration block, SWIR spectrometer with its optics, instrument control unit and a cooling block. The total mass of Tropomi will be 200 kg with a power consumption of 170 watts on average and a data output of 140 Gbit per orbit.

The instrument was built by a joint venture between the Netherlands Space Office, Royal Netherlands Meteorological Institute, Netherlands Institute for Space Research, Netherlands Organisation for Applied Scientific Research and Airbus Defence and Space Netherlands.

The SWIR spectrometer was designed and built by the Optical Payloads Group of Surrey Satellites (SSTL); it employs an immersed grating design in which light impinges upon an etched grating from within a high-index substrate (silicon in this case). The reduced wavelength within the refractive medium permits an efficient, space-saving design. The SWIR grating was provided by SRON (Netherlands), who also provided the Front-End Electronics (FEE). The SWIR spectrometer receives light from the main instrument via an intermediate pupil, and directs this - via a telescope - towards a slit which defines the along-track footprint of the instrument on the ground. Light from the slit is re-collimated, diffracted by the immersed-grating at high-order and finally imaged onto a two-dimensional detector by a high aperture relay lens. The SWIR detector (furnished by Sofradir, France) has 256 elements in the across-track direction and 1024 elements in the spectral direction (the element pitch is 30 microns); it is operated cold (typically 140 K). The SWIR spectrometer optics are mounted on a cooled optical bench (approximately 200K) and the instrument is insulated by a multiple-layer insulation (MLI) blanket. The SWIR instrument was aligned, focussed and characterised at the Mullard Space Science laboratory thermal vacuum facility in Surrey, UK.

The Tropospheric Monitoring Instrument provides the most detailed methane emissions monitoring available. It has a resolution of about 50 square kilometres.

History
The first large contract for Sentinel-5P was signed in July 2009 for Tropomi instrument between the European Space Agency and Dutch Ministry of Economic Affairs which contributed  million. On 8 December 2011, ESA selected Astrium UK as a prime contractor for the satellite, signing contract worth  million. Construction of the satellite itself was completed in May 2014, and integration with its primary instrument has been completed successfully. From design to launch Tropomi cost  million.

The satellite was launched by Eurockot Launch Services onboard Rokot. The launch was originally planned for late 2014, but had been postponed multiple times, before occurring on 13 October 2017 at 09:27 UTC from Plesetsk Cosmodrome Site 133. Sentinel-5P successfully reached its final orbit 79 minutes after lift-off from the Plesetsk cosmodrome.

Usage

The Tropomi instrument on the satellite showed substantial reductions in nitrogen dioxide amounts over Chinese cities between late January and February 2020. These were linked to China's response to the coronavirus pandemic which greatly reduced industrial and other polluting activities. Sentinel-5P pollution data also helped to confirm a correlation between a higher incidence of COVID-19 and chronic exposure to air pollutants.

References

External links
 Sentinel 5 Precursor website
 TROPOMI website
 Sentinel-5 Precursor internal view video
 Sentinel-5 Precursor datasheet
Real-time orbital tracking - uphere.space

Copernicus Programme
Earth observation satellites of the European Space Agency
Spacecraft launched by Rokot rockets
Spacecraft launched in 2017